The 2017 AMF Futsal Women's World Cup, also known as the Mundial AMF Futsal Femenino 2017, was the third edition of the AMF Futsal Women's World Cup. The tournament was held in Balaguer, Catalonia from 19 to 25 November 2017. Twelve national teams from all confederations participated in the tournament including: Argentina, Australia, Brazil, Catalonia, Chinese Taipei, Colombia, France, Italy, Paraguay, South Africa, Switzerland and the United States.

Participating teams
In addition to host nation Catalonia, 12 nations participated.

1.Teams that made their debut.

Group stage
The group winners and runners-up advanced to the quarter-finals. Those who finished in last place in their respective groups advanced to the 9th–12th classification stage.

Group A

Group B

Group C

Group D

Knockout stage

Classification 9th–12th

Classification 1st–8th

Classification 9th–12th (Semi-finals)

11th place match

9th place match

Quarter-finals

5th–8th (Semi-finals)

Semi-finals

7th place match

5th place match

Third place play-off

Final

Final tournament team rankings

|-
| colspan="11"| 5th through 8th
|-

|-
| colspan="11"| 9th through 12th
|-

References

External links 

 

AMF Futsal Women's World Cup
2017–18 in Spanish futsal
International futsal competitions hosted by Catalonia